St. Francis Xavier School  (a.k.a. S.F.X.) is an Independent Catholic School of the Vancouver Archdiocese. S.F.X. was ranked number one in "Report Card on British Columbia’s Elementary Schools" by The Fraser Institute in the 2008 edition. The school is a dual stream elementary school, established by St. Francis Xavier Parish in 1933, and it follows the policies and procedures recommended by the CISVA (Catholic Independent Schools of the Vancouver Archdiocese). The school enrolment consists of 440 students with a class size of approximately 28 students. St. Francis Xavier School offers education from Kindergarten through to Grade 7. The school was originally located near Chinatown but is now located north of Mount Pleasant. The current principal is Brian Fader.

Independent school status

St. Francis Xavier School is classified as a Group 1 school under British Columbia's Independent School Act.  Schools in this category receive partial funding from the Ministry of Education.  As of 2006 that consists of 50% of their local school districts per student operating grant based on full-time equivalent (FTE) student basis. Under the Act, the school has the "freedom to approach the curriculum from their own perspectives." However, Group 1 schools must:"...employ BC certified teachers, have educational programs consistent with ministerial orders, provide a program that meets the learning outcomes of the British Columbia curriculum, meet various administrative requirements, maintain adequate educational facilities, and comply with municipal and regional district codes."

The school receives no funding for capital costs.

Pastory
The Grey Sisters of the Immaculate Conception from Pembroke, Ontario, founded St. Francis Xavier School in 1933. From a donation, a house and land was purchased at the corner of Georgia Street and Princess Avenue in Chinatown.

A Kindergarten was opened in one of the rooms of the house.  The first class consisted of 30 kindergarten students.  The Kindergarten was moved to another building across the street in 1934.  The grade school started in 1938, housed in three rented classrooms on the third storey of a bank building situated at the corner of Main and East Pender Street in Vancouver.  There were three grades in each classroom with a total enrolment of 30.  In 1940, the first school building, located at the corner of East Georgia Street and Princess Avenue, was constructed to accommodate about 70 students.

Over the years, the school population had outgrown the school building to such an extent that more than half of the students had to be housed in various rented buildings.  Another building was acquired on East Pender Street.  The parish and school fundraised for 20 years to build a new school.  The construction took two years to complete. In 2001, the school building at 428 Great Northern Way was completed.  Operations began in September 2001.  Most Reverend Adam Exner, OMI, Archbishop of Vancouver blessed the new school on December 2, 2001.  The school has 16 classrooms.

Principals
19__–2001 : Ms. Therese Leung

2003–2009 : Ms. Brenda Krivuzoff

2009–2018: Mr. Brian Fader

2018-2019: Ms. Anne Yam

2019-Present: Mr. Brian Fader

Uniform
All students are required to wear full uniform at all times excluding special occasions. Inside the school building, outerwear is not permitted to be worn over the uniform. The female uniform consists of a plaid kilt, Oxford white crested shirt, navy crested pullover, navy socks, and black shoes. The male uniform consists of twill navy pants, Oxford white crested shirt, navy crested pullover, navy socks, and black shoes. The P.E. uniform consists of shorts, T-shirt, and non-marking running shoes.

Children Helping Children
In September 2004, a call for help was expressed to SFX school. Immediately, administration, teachers, and students offered to help in meeting that need. The need was to help homeless African children, the same ages as St. Francis Xavier students. The first of many, many Spirit Days for Amani (Peace in Swahili) took place that November. With ongoing support from SFX and other committed donors, the dream of building a home and school for the Amani children was realized. On April 28, 2007, the Amani children spent their first night in their new home in Moshi, Kilimanjaro, Tanzania. The Amani house grew in the number of children from 16 in 2001 to over 200 by 2007. In addition to providing a new home, the money from St. Francis Xavier School helped provide the children with physical rehabilitation, emotional counseling, and basic education.

St. Francis Xavier School also sells Fair Trade Certified Chocolates to help farmers get fair wages.

Spirit Days
A theme is selected by the SFX Leadership group each month and the school population is invited to show their school spirit through their participation. Themes have included pajama day, crazy hair day and fall colors day. Students must donate $2.00 to participate, with all proceeds being donated to local and international charities.

In the last three years, the school has raised over $5,000 for our designated international charity, The Amani Children's Centre, in Tanzania Africa. This is a place where orphaned, abandoned and abused children are given refuge. Students have enjoyed learning about these children and seeing the difference that donations can make in their lives. To see these young people, please visit www.amanikids.org.

Concerts
The school released their first CD project, SFX Forever, on December 15, 2004 at AMANI NOEL, a primary Christmas presentation. AMANI NOEL is also going to be premiered again with different students on December 15, 2010. All profits from the CD went to support the Amani Centre. Messengers of Light Trilogy is a school product made purely by their teachers, Mr. Dela Luna and Mr. Kozak. In May 2014, the school came up with a production called Mulan Junior, songs taught by Mrs. Harris, choreographed by Mr. Dela Luna, and produced by Mrs. Sorochuk.

Messengers of Light Trilogy
In December 2006, the entire school performed in a completely original Christmas production. Conceived and written by school staff, Messengers of Light chronicled the angelic visitations surrounding the traditional Nativity story from the unique perspective of the archangels in a boardroom setting. Filled with soaring melodies and classical orchestration, more than 25 actors and soloists were accompanied by two massive angelic choirs with 150 singers in each. By the end of that school year, a DVD entitled "Messengers of Light" was issued of the performance preserving the memorable event for the school community for years to come.

The sequel, Messengers of Light II, took place on Wednesday, February 27, and Thursday, February 28 at the SFX gym.

Messengers of Light III, the last installment of the Messengers of Light Trilogy, took place on Wednesday, April 29, and Thursday, April 30, 2009, at the SFX gym. The performance is approximately 90 minutes. The admission were by donation with the proceeds going towards equipment rentals and the Amani Children’s Home.

For more information about the Messengers of Light III, go to:  http://sfxschool.ca/pdf/bulletins/2009/bulletin_apr09.pdf

Mulan Junior Production
On the days, May 8 and May 9, 2014, the entire school performed in a production called Mulan Junior. Every single student took a part in this play, with classes going on and off the stage. It was the highlight of the year for SFX.

In 2016, The school performed The Little Mermaid Jr. Musical. The cast consisted of the intermediate students (grade 6-7), while the other students performed songs in groups.

In 2018, The school performed the Aladdin Junior Musical.

Sports
Saint Francis Xavier has teams for the following sports:
 Soccer
 Volleyball
 Basketball
 Badminton
 Track and Field
 Cross Country Running
 Frisbee
 American Football

Clubs
At SFX, they have many clubs to be a part of such as:
 Young Authors Club
 Prayer Group
 Craft Club
 Drawing Club
 Green Club
 Leadership Group (grades 4–7)
 Social Justice Group (grades K–7)
 Library Club (grades 5–7)
 Yearbook (Grade 7s only)

The Young Authors' Club and The Ninety-fives
During the 2007–2008 year, the Library Club came publicly to be, as it was an under-the-radar club before; a group of grade sevens, the grads of '08, including young girls and a boy, joined the Library Club. They first and foremost joined because they were looking for a way to complete their 20 hours of service to the community, being the school community or the real world. The service hours were a graduation requirement.

They had a united interest in books, and writing. The Library Club, that included shelving books, shelf reading, mending books, and others, evolved from just being a way to earn service hours but a place for young minds to explore, learn, and come to love writing. The Young Authors' Club was born; its job is to publish student work under a number of conditions. Thus, The Ninety-fives became one of the first in the YAC club, penning the book that would take many lunch hours, recess, and months to complete, with the careful eye of Ms. Fountain, one of the Librarians, checking and reading over their work, they were on their way.

Finally, finished as the last minutes of school ticked by, a book entitled, How to Survive Grade 7, a book about all the problems faced in the time frame of that year, how the Ninety-fives lived, survived, and how they gave advice to those facing problems. Now in high school, the Ninety-fives have greatly expanded and remained strong, extending help through social networks, such as Twitter, Facebook, YouTube, and their own website, as well as a new book entitled "How to Survive Grade 8" which is yet to be published, so they can be there to help you when ever you need it. How one club can inspire a generation, who grew up with computers and iPods, to love writing, and reading books. It was a literary success.

Notable alumni
Hollie Lo -actress in the movie "Eve and the Fire Horse"

Awards
Garfield Weston Awards for Excellence in Education:
 2006– Academic Achievement in Excess of Expectations, Runner Up
 2007– Academic Achievement in Excess of Expectations, School of Distinction
 2008– Determination of Academic Achievement, 2nd Runner Up

References

Roman Catholic Archdiocese of Vancouver listing for St. Francis Xavier School 
SFX School Website
NinetyFives Website
NinetyFives' Twitter

External links
St. Francis Xavier School official website
Messengers of Light Article 1
Messengers of Light Article 2
SFX Amani article
Amani Center

Private schools in British Columbia
Catholic elementary schools in British Columbia
Educational institutions established in 1933
1933 establishments in British Columbia